Nicole Campbell-Green is a Jamaican international football midfielder.

External links 
 

Living people
Jamaica women's international footballers
Jamaican women's footballers
Women's association football midfielders
Year of birth missing (living people)